Muhammed Ahmed Faris (Muḥammad ʾAḥmad Fāris; born 26 May 1951) is a Syrian military aviator. He was the first Syrian and the second Arab in space.

Career
Born in Aleppo, Syria, he was a pilot in the Syrian Air Force with the rank of a colonel. He specialized in navigation when he was selected to participate in the Intercosmos spaceflight program on 30 September 1985.

He flew as Research Cosmonaut in the Interkosmos program on Soyuz TM-3 to the Mir space station in July 1987, spending 7 days 23 hours and 5 minutes in space. He returned to Earth aboard Soyuz TM-2.

He is credited with carrying the first recorded Earth dirt into space, which was a vial carrying soil from Damascus.

Faris was awarded the title Hero of the Soviet Union on 30 July 1987; he was also awarded the Order of Lenin.

After his spaceflight, Faris returned to the Syrian Air Force and lived in Aleppo.

Syrian civil war
On 4 August 2012, during the Syrian civil war, Faris defected from Bashar al-Assad's regime and joined the armed opposition.

On 13 September 2012, made an exclusive interview with Al Aan TV and covered many topics regarding the ongoing civil war in Syria.

Faris is also part of the National Coordination Committee for Democratic Change, an anti-Assad grouping.

In a March 2016 interview as a Syrian refugee in Turkey, Faris stated regarding the ongoing civil war: "I tell Europe if you don't want refugees, then you should help us get rid of this regime," adding "I am very sorry about the Russian interference, which has stood on the side of dictator Bashar Assad, and has begun to kill the Syrian people with their planes".

In September 2017, Faris was appointed Defense Minister of the Syrian Interim Government, a self-appointed opposition grouping.

Personal life
Faris is married and has three children.

See also

 List of Muslim astronauts
 List of Arab astronauts

References

External links
 Spacefacts biography of Muhammed Faris
 Space Knight

1951 births
Living people
Syrian cosmonauts
Syrian people of Arab descent
Syrian Muslims
Foreign Heroes of the Soviet Union
Recipients of the Order of Lenin
People from Aleppo
Syrian Air Force personnel
Syrian defectors
Recipients of the Medal "For Merit in Space Exploration"
Mir crew members